The 1928 Pittsburgh Pirates season was the 47th season in franchise history. The team scored the most runs in the National League. However, they also allowed the third most and slipped down to fourth place in the standings.

Offseason
 December 3, 1927: Mike Cvengros and Ike Danning were traded by the Pirates to the Wichita Falls Spudders for Fred Fussell.

Regular season
During the season, Burleigh Grimes became the last pitcher to win at least 25 games in one season for the Pirates in the 20th century.

Season standings

Record vs. opponents

Game log

|- bgcolor="ffbbbb"
| 1 || April 11 || @ Cardinals || 7–14 || Haines || Kremer (0–1) || — || 25,000 || 0–1
|- bgcolor="ffbbbb"
| 2 || April 12 || @ Cardinals || 0–5 || Alexander || Grimes (0–1) || — || — || 0–2
|- bgcolor="ffbbbb"
| 3 || April 14 || @ Reds || 0–5 || Lucas || Miljus (0–1) || — || 2,500 || 0–3
|- bgcolor="ccffcc"
| 4 || April 15 || @ Reds || 3–2 || Dawson (1–0) || Luque || Hill (1) || — || 1–3
|- bgcolor="ccffcc"
| 5 || April 16 || @ Reds || 8–1 || Grimes (1–1) || Rixey || — || — || 2–3
|- bgcolor="ffbbbb"
| 6 || April 19 || Cardinals || 10–13 || Littlejohn || Miljus (0–2) || Sherdel || 30,000 || 2–4
|- bgcolor="ffbbbb"
| 7 || April 20 || Cardinals || 2–6 || Haines || Grimes (1–2) || — || — || 2–5
|- bgcolor="ffbbbb"
| 8 || April 22 || @ Cubs || 2–3 || Jones || Miljus (0–3) || — || 50,000 || 2–6
|- bgcolor="ccffcc"
| 9 || April 23 || @ Cubs || 6–0 || Kremer (1–1) || Malone || — || — || 3–6
|- bgcolor="ffbbbb"
| 10 || April 24 || @ Cubs || 2–7 || Blake || Dawson (1–1) || — || — || 3–7
|- bgcolor="ccffcc"
| 11 || April 25 || @ Cubs || 10–0 || Grimes (2–2) || Root || — || — || 4–7
|- bgcolor="ccffcc"
| 12 || April 26 || Reds || 7–2 || Hill (1–0) || Edwards || — || — || 5–7
|- bgcolor="ffbbbb"
| 13 || April 29 || @ Reds || 2–3 || Rixey || Kremer (1–2) || — || — || 5–8
|- bgcolor="ccffcc"
| 14 || April 30 || Cubs || 8–7 || Miljus (1–3) || Malone || — || — || 6–8
|-

|- bgcolor="ccffcc"
| 15 || May 1 || Cubs || 4–1 || Hill (2–0) || Bush || — || — || 7–8
|- bgcolor="ccffcc"
| 16 || May 2 || Cubs || 9–8 (10) || Dawson (2–1) || Nehf || — || — || 8–8
|- bgcolor="ffbbbb"
| 17 || May 3 || Braves || 4–5 (11) || Brandt || Kremer (1–3) || — || — || 8–9
|- bgcolor="ccffcc"
| 18 || May 4 || Braves || 13–3 || Grimes (3–2) || Greenfield || — || — || 9–9
|- bgcolor="ccffcc"
| 19 || May 5 || Braves || 6–2 || Dawson (3–1) || Smith || Miljus (1) || — || 10–9
|- bgcolor="ccffcc"
| 20 || May 7 || Braves || 9–4 || Miljus (2–3) || Robertson || — || — || 11–9
|- bgcolor="ccffcc"
| 21 || May 8 || Giants || 6–5 || Grimes (4–2) || Henry || — || — || 12–9
|- bgcolor="ffbbbb"
| 22 || May 9 || Giants || 0–6 || Barnes || Dawson (3–2) || — || — || 12–10
|- bgcolor="ffbbbb"
| 23 || May 10 || Giants || 4–5 || Fitzsimmons || Kremer (1–4) || — || — || 12–11
|- bgcolor="ccffcc"
| 24 || May 12 || Robins || 5–4 || Hill (3–0) || McWeeny || — || 10,000 || 13–11
|- bgcolor="ffbbbb"
| 25 || May 13 || @ Robins || 5–8 || Clark || Grimes (4–3) || — || 22,000 || 13–12
|- bgcolor="ffbbbb"
| 26 || May 14 || Robins || 6–7 || Doak || Brame (0–1) || Vance || — || 13–13
|- bgcolor="ffbbbb"
| 27 || May 15 || Robins || 3–10 || McWeeny || Miljus (2–4) || — || — || 13–14
|- bgcolor="ccffcc"
| 28 || May 18 || Phillies || 6–4 || Kremer (2–4) || Miller || Grimes (1) || — || 14–14
|- bgcolor="ccffcc"
| 29 || May 19 || Phillies || 3–1 || Hill (4–0) || Benge || — || — || 15–14
|- bgcolor="ffbbbb"
| 30 || May 20 || @ Reds || 2–3 || Lucas || Grimes (4–4) || — || — || 15–15
|- bgcolor="ffbbbb"
| 31 || May 21 || @ Reds || 3–4 || Rixey || Dawson (3–3) || — || — || 15–16
|- bgcolor="ccffcc"
| 32 || May 21 || @ Reds || 6–3 || Fussell (1–0) || May || — || — || 16–16
|- bgcolor="ffbbbb"
| 33 || May 22 || @ Reds || 4–5 || Mays || Kremer (2–5) || — || — || 16–17
|- bgcolor="ffbbbb"
| 34 || May 23 || @ Reds || 3–4 (10) || Luque || Hill (4–1) || — || — || 16–18
|- bgcolor="ccffcc"
| 35 || May 24 || Cubs || 6–2 || Grimes (5–4) || Nehf || — || — || 17–18
|- bgcolor="ffbbbb"
| 36 || May 25 || Cubs || 3–10 || Root || Fussell (1–1) || — || — || 17–19
|- bgcolor="ffbbbb"
| 37 || May 26 || Cubs || 1–6 || Malone || Kremer (2–6) || — || — || 17–20
|- bgcolor="ffbbbb"
| 38 || May 27 || @ Cubs || 0–3 || Blake || Hill (4–2) || — || 35,000 || 17–21
|- bgcolor="ffbbbb"
| 39 || May 29 || Cardinals || 1–7 || Rhem || Grimes (5–5) || — || — || 17–22
|- bgcolor="ffbbbb"
| 40 || May 30 || Cardinals || 1–10 || Sherdel || Miljus (2–5) || — || — || 17–23
|- bgcolor="ffbbbb"
| 41 || May 30 || Cardinals || 3–4 || Johnson || Kremer (2–7) || Haid || — || 17–24
|- bgcolor="ccffcc"
| 42 || May 31 || Cardinals || 3–2 || Hill (5–2) || Haines || — || — || 18–24
|-

|- bgcolor="ccffcc"
| 43 || June 1 || Cubs || 10–4 || Grimes (6–5) || Blake || — || — || 19–24
|- bgcolor="ffbbbb"
| 44 || June 2 || Cubs || 6–10 || Weinert || Dawson (3–4) || Root || — || 19–25
|- bgcolor="ccffcc"
| 45 || June 3 || @ Robins || 9–7 (14) || Grimes (7–5) || Petty || — || 25,000 || 20–25
|- bgcolor="ccffcc"
| 46 || June 7 || @ Braves || 8–6 (12) || Burwell (1–0) || Smith || — || — || 21–25
|- bgcolor="ffbbbb"
| 47 || June 8 || @ Braves || 5–9 || Brandt || Kremer (2–8) || — || — || 21–26
|- bgcolor="ccffcc"
| 48 || June 9 || @ Braves || 6–2 || Grimes (8–5) || Genewich || — || — || 22–26
|- bgcolor="ccffcc"
| 49 || June 9 || @ Braves || 6–3 || Miljus (3–5) || Robertson || — || — || 23–26
|- bgcolor="ffbbbb"
| 50 || June 11 || @ Phillies || 4–6 || Ring || Hill (5–3) || Sweetland || — || 23–27
|- bgcolor="ccffcc"
| 51 || June 12 || @ Phillies || 15–4 || Kremer (3–8) || Miller || — || — || 24–27
|- bgcolor="ffbbbb"
| 52 || June 13 || @ Phillies || 3–4 || Sweetland || Grimes (8–6) || — || — || 24–28
|- bgcolor="ccffcc"
| 53 || June 14 || @ Giants || 4–3 (11) || Miljus (4–5) || Fitzsimmons || — || — || 25–28
|- bgcolor="ffbbbb"
| 54 || June 15 || @ Giants || 1–9 || Aldridge || Hill (5–4) || — || 9,000 || 25–29
|- bgcolor="ffbbbb"
| 55 || June 16 || @ Giants || 0–4 || Benton || Kremer (3–9) || — || — || 25–30
|- bgcolor="ccffcc"
| 56 || June 17 || @ Giants || 6–0 || Grimes (9–6) || Henry || — || — || 26–30
|- bgcolor="ccffcc"
| 57 || June 20 || Reds || 2–1 || Kremer (4–9) || Rixey || — || — || 27–30
|- bgcolor="ffbbbb"
| 58 || June 21 || Reds || 4–5 || Appleton || Fussell (1–2) || — || — || 27–31
|- bgcolor="ccffcc"
| 59 || June 22 || Reds || 11–1 || Grimes (10–6) || Kolp || — || — || 28–31
|- bgcolor="ccffcc"
| 60 || June 23 || Reds || 6–5 (10) || Miljus (5–5) || Kolp || — || — || 29–31
|- bgcolor="ffbbbb"
| 61 || June 24 || @ Cubs || 1–8 || Nehf || Kremer (4–10) || — || 15,000 || 29–32
|- bgcolor="ccffcc"
| 62 || June 26 || @ Cubs || 1–0 || Grimes (11–6) || Blake || — || — || 30–32
|- bgcolor="ffbbbb"
| 63 || June 26 || @ Cubs || 3–7 || Bush || Miljus (5–6) || Malone || — || 30–33
|- bgcolor="ffbbbb"
| 64 || June 28 || @ Cardinals || 3–4 || Sherdel || Hill (5–5) || — || — || 30–34
|- bgcolor="ffbbbb"
| 65 || June 29 || @ Cardinals || 4–9 || Mitchell || Kremer (4–11) || — || — || 30–35
|- bgcolor="ccffcc"
| 66 || June 30 || @ Cardinals || 4–3 || Grimes (12–6) || Alexander || — || — || 31–35
|-

|- bgcolor="ccffcc"
| 67 || July 1 || @ Cardinals || 2–0 || Fussell (2–2) || Haines || — || — || 32–35
|- bgcolor="ffbbbb"
| 68 || July 1 || @ Cardinals || 6–8 || Johnson || Miljus (5–7) || Haid || — || 32–36
|- bgcolor="ffbbbb"
| 69 || July 3 || Reds || 7–9 || Edwards || Grimes (12–7) || — || — || 32–37
|- bgcolor="ffbbbb"
| 70 || July 4 || Reds || 0–6 || Rixey || Dawson (3–5) || — || — || 32–38
|- bgcolor="ffbbbb"
| 71 || July 4 || Reds || 3–11 || Kolp || Grimes (12–8) || — || — || 32–39
|- bgcolor="ffbbbb"
| 72 || July 6 || Giants || 7–11 || Faulkner || Fussell (2–3) || — || — || 32–40
|- bgcolor="ccffcc"
| 73 || July 7 || Giants || 8–6 || Fussell (3–3) || Benton || — || — || 33–40
|- bgcolor="ccffcc"
| 74 || July 7 || Giants || 5–2 || Brame (1–1) || Fitzsimmons || — || — || 34–40
|- bgcolor="ccffcc"
| 75 || July 9 || Giants || 5–3 || Grimes (13–8) || Faulkner || — || — || 35–40
|- bgcolor="ccffcc"
| 76 || July 10 || Phillies || 6–5 || Kremer (5–11) || Ring || — || — || 36–40
|- bgcolor="ccffcc"
| 77 || July 11 || Phillies || 3–1 (6) || Brame (2–1) || Benge || Hill (2) || — || 37–40
|- bgcolor="ccffcc"
| 78 || July 14 || Braves || 10–0 || Grimes (14–8) || Brandt || — || — || 38–40
|- bgcolor="ccffcc"
| 79 || July 16 || Braves || 8–3 || Kremer (6–11) || Delaney || — || — || 39–40
|- bgcolor="ccffcc"
| 80 || July 17 || Braves || 7–6 || Hill (6–5) || Smith || Fussell (1) || — || 40–40
|- bgcolor="ccffcc"
| 81 || July 18 || Braves || 16–3 || Grimes (15–8) || Barnes || — || — || 41–40
|- bgcolor="ffbbbb"
| 82 || July 19 || Robins || 0–3 || McWeeny || Fussell (3–4) || — || — || 41–41
|- bgcolor="ffbbbb"
| 83 || July 20 || Robins || 7–8 || Elliott || Kremer (6–12) || Clark || 4,000 || 41–42
|- bgcolor="ccffcc"
| 84 || July 21 || Robins || 7–3 || Hill (7–5) || Ehrhardt || — || — || 42–42
|- bgcolor="ccffcc"
| 85 || July 21 || Robins || 10–2 || Meadows (1–0) || Petty || — || 15,000 || 43–42
|- bgcolor="ffbbbb"
| 86 || July 22 || @ Robins || 0–5 || Vance || Grimes (15–9) || — || — || 43–43
|- bgcolor="ccffcc"
| 87 || July 22 || @ Robins || 6–5 || Kremer (7–12) || Clark || — || 29,000 || 44–43
|- bgcolor="ccffcc"
| 88 || July 23 || @ Robins || 2–1 || Fussell (4–4) || McWeeny || — || — || 45–43
|- bgcolor="ffbbbb"
| 89 || July 24 || @ Giants || 3–6 || Benton || Dawson (3–6) || — || — || 45–44
|- bgcolor="ffbbbb"
| 90 || July 25 || @ Giants || 5–6 || Walker || Hill (7–6) || Genewich || — || 45–45
|- bgcolor="ccffcc"
| 91 || July 26 || @ Giants || 7–5 || Grimes (16–9) || Hubbell || — || — || 46–45
|- bgcolor="ffbbbb"
| 92 || July 27 || @ Giants || 2–4 || Fitzsimmons || Fussell (4–5) || — || — || 46–46
|- bgcolor="ccffcc"
| 93 || July 30 || @ Braves || 2–1 || Kremer (8–12) || Brandt || — || — || 47–46
|- bgcolor="ccffcc"
| 94 || July 30 || @ Braves || 6–5 (10) || Grimes (17–9) || Barnes || — || — || 48–46
|- bgcolor="ffbbbb"
| 95 || July 31 || @ Braves || 5–11 || Smith || Meadows (1–1) || — || — || 48–47
|-

|- bgcolor="ccffcc"
| 96 || August 2 || @ Phillies || 18–4 || Grimes (18–9) || Miller || Dawson (1) || — || 49–47
|- bgcolor="ccffcc"
| 97 || August 3 || @ Phillies || 14–6 || Fussell (5–5) || Sweetland || Tauscher (1) || — || 50–47
|- bgcolor="ccffcc"
| 98 || August 4 || @ Phillies || 14–8 || Grimes (19–9) || Benge || — || — || 51–47
|- bgcolor="ccffcc"
| 99 || August 4 || @ Phillies || 11–4 || Hill (8–6) || Ring || Dawson (2) || — || 52–47
|- bgcolor="ccffcc"
| 100 || August 7 || @ Robins || 4–3 || Grimes (20–9) || McWeeny || — || — || 53–47
|- bgcolor="ccffcc"
| 101 || August 7 || @ Robins || 3–2 (12) || Hill (9–6) || Elliott || — || 6,500 || 54–47
|- bgcolor="ccffcc"
| 102 || August 8 || @ Robins || 4–3 || Kremer (9–12) || McWeeny || — || 2,500 || 55–47
|- bgcolor="ccffcc"
| 103 || August 9 || Cardinals || 5–4 || Hill (10–6) || Haines || Grimes (2) || — || 56–47
|- bgcolor="ffbbbb"
| 104 || August 10 || Cardinals || 1–2 (12) || Mitchell || Fussell (5–6) || Sherdel || — || 56–48
|- bgcolor="ffbbbb"
| 105 || August 11 || Reds || 0–1 || Lucas || Grimes (20–10) || — || — || 56–49
|- bgcolor="ccffcc"
| 106 || August 13 || Robins || 6–1 || Kremer (10–12) || Doak || — || — || 57–49
|- bgcolor="ccffcc"
| 107 || August 14 || Robins || 4–2 || Hill (11–6) || McWeeny || — || — || 58–49
|- bgcolor="ffbbbb"
| 108 || August 15 || Robins || 5–6 || Vance || Fussell (5–7) || Petty || — || 58–50
|- bgcolor="ccffcc"
| 109 || August 16 || Robins || 11–6 || Grimes (21–10) || Doak || — || — || 59–50
|- bgcolor="ccffcc"
| 110 || August 17 || Phillies || 10–3 || Kremer (11–12) || Willoughby || — || — || 60–50
|- bgcolor="ccffcc"
| 111 || August 17 || Phillies || 9–1 || Brame (3–1) || Sweetland || — || — || 61–50
|- bgcolor="ccffcc"
| 112 || August 18 || Phillies || 9–0 || Hill (12–6) || Benge || — || — || 62–50
|- bgcolor="ffbbbb"
| 113 || August 18 || Phillies || 8–11 || Ring || Fussell (5–8) || Ferguson || — || 62–51
|- bgcolor="ffbbbb"
| 114 || August 20 || Braves || 11–14 || Smith || Grimes (21–11) || Delaney || — || 62–52
|- bgcolor="ccffcc"
| 115 || August 21 || Braves || 6–2 || Kremer (12–12) || Brandt || — || — || 63–52
|- bgcolor="ccffcc"
| 116 || August 22 || Braves || 10–3 || Brame (4–1) || Greenfield || — || — || 64–52
|- bgcolor="ffbbbb"
| 117 || August 23 || Giants || 3–6 || Benton || Hill (12–7) || Scott || 35,000 || 64–53
|- bgcolor="ccffcc"
| 118 || August 23 || Giants || 13–3 || Fussell (6–8) || Hubbell || — || 30,000 || 65–53
|- bgcolor="ccffcc"
| 119 || August 24 || Giants || 16–5 || Grimes (22–11) || Genewich || — || — || 66–53
|- bgcolor="ccffcc"
| 120 || August 25 || Giants || 7–1 || Kremer (13–12) || Fitzsimmons || — || — || 67–53
|- bgcolor="ffbbbb"
| 121 || August 26 || @ Reds || 3–4 || Lucas || Brame (4–2) || — || — || 67–54
|- bgcolor="ccffcc"
| 122 || August 27 || @ Reds || 9–4 || Fussell (7–8) || Luque || — || — || 68–54
|- bgcolor="ccffcc"
| 123 || August 28 || Phillies || 9–2 || Hill (13–7) || Sweetland || — || — || 69–54
|- bgcolor="ccffcc"
| 124 || August 28 || Phillies || 16–7 || Dawson (4–6) || Benge || — || — || 70–54
|- bgcolor="ffbbbb"
| 125 || August 29 || Phillies || 0–4 (7) || Willoughby || Brame (4–3) || — || — || 70–55
|- bgcolor="ccffcc"
| 126 || August 31 || Cardinals || 6–5 || Kremer (14–12) || Alexander || Grimes (3) || — || 71–55
|- bgcolor="ffbbbb"
| 127 || August 31 || Cardinals || 2–6 || Haines || Fussell (7–9) || — || — || 71–56
|-

|- bgcolor="ffbbbb"
| 128 || September 1 || Cardinals || 1–4 || Sherdel || Hill (13–8) || — || — || 71–57
|- bgcolor="ffbbbb"
| 129 || September 2 || @ Cubs || 2–3 || Malone || Grimes (22–12) || — || 32,000 || 71–58
|- bgcolor="ccffcc"
| 130 || September 3 || Cubs || 16–1 || Brame (5–3) || Root || — || — || 72–58
|- bgcolor="ccffcc"
| 131 || September 3 || Cubs || 6–3 || Kremer (15–12) || Carlson || — || — || 73–58
|- bgcolor="ffbbbb"
| 132 || September 4 || Cubs || 8–9 || Blake || Hill (13–9) || — || — || 73–59
|- bgcolor="ffbbbb"
| 133 || September 6 || @ Cardinals || 3–4 (10) || Mitchell || Grimes (22–13) || — || 10,000 || 73–60
|- bgcolor="ffbbbb"
| 134 || September 7 || @ Cardinals || 3–6 || Haines || Kremer (15–13) || — || — || 73–61
|- bgcolor="ccffcc"
| 135 || September 8 || @ Cardinals || 4–2 || Hill (14–9) || Sherdel || — || — || 74–61
|- bgcolor="ccffcc"
| 136 || September 9 || @ Cardinals || 8–7 || Dawson (5–6) || Reinhart || — || — || 75–61
|- bgcolor="ccffcc"
| 137 || September 10 || @ Cubs || 7–5 || Grimes (23–13) || Nehf || — || — || 76–61
|- bgcolor="ffbbbb"
| 138 || September 11 || @ Cubs || 3–9 || Malone || Hill (14–10) || — || — || 76–62
|- bgcolor="ccffcc"
| 139 || September 14 || Reds || 4–1 || Grimes (24–13) || Rixey || — || — || 77–62
|- bgcolor="ccffcc"
| 140 || September 15 || Reds || 6–1 || Hill (15–10) || Ash || — || — || 78–62
|- bgcolor="ccffcc"
| 141 || September 16 || @ Giants || 1–0 || Fussell (8–9) || Benton || — || 50,000 || 79–62
|- bgcolor="ffbbbb"
| 142 || September 17 || @ Giants || 2–9 || Hubbell || Brame (5–4) || — || 3,000 || 79–63
|- bgcolor="ffbbbb"
| 143 || September 18 || @ Giants || 2–3 (10) || Fitzsimmons || Dawson (5–7) || — || — || 79–64
|- bgcolor="ccffcc"
| 144 || September 20 || @ Phillies || 6–4 || Hill (16–10) || Willoughby || — || — || 80–64
|- bgcolor="ccffcc"
| 145 || September 21 || @ Phillies || 6–5 || Dawson (6–7) || Sweetland || — || — || 81–64
|- bgcolor="ccffcc"
| 146 || September 22 || @ Phillies || 9–7 || Grimes (25–13) || McGraw || — || — || 82–64
|- bgcolor="ccffcc"
| 147 || September 22 || @ Phillies || 5–3 || Brame (6–4) || Caldwell || — || — || 83–64
|- bgcolor="ccffcc"
| 148 || September 24 || @ Braves || 3–1 (10) || Dawson (7–7) || Delaney || — || — || 84–64
|- bgcolor="ffbbbb"
| 149 || September 24 || @ Braves || 2–4 || Smith || Blankenship (0–1) || — || — || 84–65
|- bgcolor="ccffcc"
| 150 || September 25 || @ Braves || 13–8 || Brame (7–4) || Greenfield || Dawson (3) || — || 85–65
|- bgcolor="ffbbbb"
| 151 || September 27 || @ Robins || 6–7 (10) || Petty || Grimes (25–14) || — || — || 85–66
|- bgcolor="ffbbbb"
| 152 || September 27 || @ Robins || 1–8 || Koupal || Blankenship (0–2) || — || — || 85–67
|-

|-
| Legend:       = Win       = LossBold = Pirates team member

Opening Day lineup

Roster

Player stats

Batting

Starters by position
Note: Pos = Position; G = Games played; AB = At bats; H = Hits; Avg. = Batting average; HR = Home runs; RBI = Runs batted in

Other batters
Note: G = Games played; AB = At bats; H = Hits; Avg. = Batting average; HR = Home runs; RBI = Runs batted in

Pitching

Starting pitchers
Note: G = Games pitched; IP = Innings pitched; W = Wins; L = Losses; ERA = Earned run average; SO = Strikeouts

Other pitchers
Note: G = Games pitched; IP = Innings pitched; W = Wins; L = Losses; ERA = Earned run average; SO = Strikeouts

Relief pitchers
Note: G = Games pitched; W = Wins; L = Losses; SV = Saves; ERA = Earned run average; SO = Strikeouts

League leaders
George Grantham
 #3 in NL in on-base percentage (.408)

Burleigh Grimes
 MLB leader in wins (25)
 #4 in NL in strikeouts (97)

Pie Traynor
 #2 in NL in RBI (124)

Lloyd Waner
 #3 in NL in runs scored (121)

Paul Waner
 NL leader in runs scored (142)
 #2 in NL in batting average (.370)
 #2 in NL in on-base percentage (.446)

References

External links
 1928 Pittsburgh Pirates team page at Baseball Reference
 1928 Pittsburgh Pirates Page at Baseball Almanac

Pittsburgh Pirates seasons
Pittsburgh Pirates season
Pittsburg Pir